Desire (Spanish: Desearás al hombre de tu hermana) is a 2017 period erotic thriller film directed by Diego Kaplan and written by Erika Halvorsen based on an idea by Alex Kahanoff. It stars Carolina "Pampita" Ardohain in her first leading role, along with Mónica Antonópulos, Guilherme Winter, Juan Sorini and Andrea Frigerio. The film is about a young woman who goes to her estranged sister's wedding to try to rekindle their relationship but after meeting the groom, she begins to fall in love with him.

Broadcast
On 21 December 2017, Netflix made the video available with English, Spanish or Portuguese subtitles, but the only audio is the original Spanish soundtrack.

Controversy 
In 2018, Netflix received online criticism claiming that the opening scene, involving a young girl accidentally having her first orgasm, was child pornography. Director Diego Kaplan defended the scene, noting, "The girls never understood what they were doing, they were just copying what they were seeing on the screen. No adult interacted with the girls, other than the child acting coach. Everything was done under the careful surveillance of the girls’ mothers." The scene uses editing, music, and sound to convey the impression that the character is accidentally masturbating.

See also

2017 in film
List of erotic films of the 2010s
Sexploitation film
Sex comedy

References

External links
  on Cinenacional.com
 
 

2017 films
2010s erotic drama films
2010s erotic thriller films
2010s Spanish-language films
Obscenity controversies in film
Films shot in Argentina
Argentine erotic drama films
Films set in the 1960s
Films set in Argentina
Films about sexuality
2017 drama films
Sexploitation films
2010s Argentine films